Ottman Corners is an unincorporated community located in the town of Trimbelle, Pierce County, Wisconsin, United States.

It was named for three brothers: Nelson, Christopher, and James Ottman who came from New York in 1859.

Notes

Unincorporated communities in Pierce County, Wisconsin
Unincorporated communities in Wisconsin